United States v. Archer Daniels Midland Co. was a criminal case filed on October 15, 1996 in which the United States alleged that Archer Daniels Midland Company (ADM) and other corporations and individuals engaged in a conspiracy to fix and maintain prices of lysine and citric acid and to restrain or eliminate competing suppliers of these additives in violation of Section 1 of the Sherman Antitrust Act. ADM entered into a plea agreement in which ADM pleaded guilty to both antitrust counts and agreed to pay a combined fine of $100 million ($70 million for the lysine count and $30 million for the citric acid count). This is equivalent to $ million in present-day terms and was at the time the largest antitrust fine ever imposed.

The United States' charges against ADM were the second round of charges brought as a result of the U.S. Department of Justice's antitrust investigation into the food and feed additives industries. The preceding August 1996, the Japanese firms Ajinomoto Co., Inc. and Kyowa Hakko Kogyo Co. Ltd. and U.S.-based Korean subsidiary Sewon America, Inc. and their executives agreed to pay more than $20 million combined for their participation in the lysine conspiracy. The Department of Justice recovered more than $195 million in fines arising from its investigation.

See also 
 Lysine price-fixing conspiracy

References 

Price fixing convictions
Archer Daniels Midland
1996 in United States case law